SHT may refer to:
 Samfundet SHT, a Swedish fraternal organisation founded in 1844
 Screaming Headless Torsos, a rock band formed in 1989 
 The IATA code for Shepparton Airport, Victoria, Australia 
 Superior Hiking Trail, a footpath in northeastern Minnesota, USA
 MTR station code for Sha Tin station, Hong Kong

See also
 The letter щ, which is romanized as <sht> when transliterating Bulgarian